Markham is a city in the Regional Municipality of York, Ontario, Canada. In the 2021 Census, Markham had a population of 338,503, which ranked it the largest in York Region, fourth largest in the Greater Toronto Area (GTA), and 16th largest in Canada.

The city gained its name from the first Lieutenant-Governor of Upper Canada, John Graves Simcoe (in office 1791–1796), who named the area after his friend, William Markham, the Archbishop of York from 1776 to 1807. 

Indigenous people lived in the area of present-day Markham for thousands of years before Europeans arrived in the area. The first European settlement in Markham occurred when William Berczy, a German artist and developer, led a group of approximately sixty-four German families to North America. Since the 1970s, Markham rapidly shifted from being an agricultural community to an industrialized municipality due to urban sprawl from neighbouring Toronto. Markham changed its status from town to city on July 1, 2012.

, tertiary industry mainly drives Markham. , "business services" employed the largest proportion of workers in Markham – nearly 22% of its labour force.
The city also has over 1,000 technology and life-sciences companies, with IBM as the city's largest employer. Several multinational companies have their Canadian headquarters in Markham, including: Honda Canada, Hyundai, Advanced Micro Devices,
Johnson & Johnson, General Motors, Avaya, IBM, Motorola, Oracle, Toshiba, Toyota Financial Services, Huawei, Honeywell and Scholastic Canada.

History

Indigenous people lived in the area of present-day Markham since the end of the last Ice Age and the city is situated on the traditional territory of the Haudenosaunee (Iroquois), Huron Wendat, Petun and Neutral people. In the early 1600s, when explorers from France arrived, they encountered the Huron-Wendat First Nation. The southwest corner of Markham is included in Treaty 13, known as the Toronto Purchase of 1787, which transferred roughly 250,800 acres of land from the Mississauga people to the British Crown for 10 shillings and fishing rights on the Etobicoke river. The remainder of Markham's land (roughly east of Woodbine Avenue/Highway 404) is covered by the Johnson-Butler Purchase of 1787-88 (aka Gunshot Treaty) and formally by the Williams Treaties, signed in 1923.

Objects recovered by local mill-owners, the Milne family, in the 1870s give evidence of a village within the boundaries of the present Milne Conservation Area.

The Lieutenant-Governor of Upper Canada, John Graves Simcoe (in office 1791–1796), named the township of Markham, north of the town of York (now Toronto), after his friend William Markham, then Archbishop of York. William Berczy first surveyed Markham as a township in 1793, and in 1794 led 75 German families (including the Ramers, Reesors, Wheters, Burkholders, Bunkers, Wicks and Lewis) from Upstate New York to an area of Markham now known as German Mills. Each family was granted  of land; however the lack of roads in the region led many to settle in York (present-day Toronto) and Niagara. German Mills later became a ghost town. Between 1803 and 1812 another attempt at settling the region was made. The largest group of settlers were Pennsylvania Dutch, most of them Mennonites. These highly skilled craftsmen and knowledgeable farmers settled the region and founded Reesorville, named after the Mennonite settler Joseph Reesor. In 1825 Reesorville was renamed to Markham, having taken the name of the unincorporated village (see Markham Village, Ontario).

By 1830 many Irish, Scottish and English families began immigrating to Upper Canada and settling in Markham. Markham's early years blended the rigours of the frontier with the development of agriculture-based industries. The township's many rivers and streams soon supported water-powered saws and gristmills and later wooden mills. With improved transportation routes, such as the construction of Yonge Street in the 1800s, along with the growing population, urbanization increased. In 1842 the township population had reached 5,698;  were under cultivation (second highest in the province), and the township had eleven gristmills and twenty-four sawmills.

In 1846 Smith's Canadian Gazetteer indicated a population of about 300, mostly Canadians, Pennsylvanian Dutch (actually Pennsylvania Deitsch or German), other Germans, Americans, Irish and a few from Britain. There were two churches with a third being built. There were tradesmen of various types, a grist mill, an oatmill mill, five stores, a distillery and a threshing-machine maker. There were eleven grist and twenty-four saw mills in the surrounding township. In 1850 the first form of structured municipal government formed in Markham.

By 1857 most of the township had been cleared of timber and was under cultivation. Villages like Thornhill, Unionville and Markham greatly expanded. In 1851 Markham Village "was a considerable village, containing between eight and nine hundred inhabitants, pleasantly situated on the Rouge River. It contains two grist mills ... a woollen factory, oatmeal mill, barley mill and distillery, foundry, two tanneries, brewery, etc., a temperance hall and four churches... ." In 1871, with a township population of 8,152, the Toronto and Nipissing Railway built the first rail line to Markham Village and Unionville, which is still used today by the GO Transit commuter services.

In 1971 Markham was incorporated as a town, as its population skyrocketed due to urban sprawl from Toronto. In 1976 Markham's population was approximately 56,000. Since that time, the population has more than quintupled, with explosive growth in new subdivisions. Much of Markham's farmland has disappeared, but some still remains north of Major Mackenzie Drive. Controversy over the development of the environmentally-sensitive Oak Ridges Moraine will likely curb development north of Major Mackenzie Drive and by Rouge National Urban Park east of Reesor Road between Major Mackenzie Drive to Steeles Avenue East to the south.

Since the 1980s Markham has been recognized as a suburb of Toronto.  the city comprises six major communities: Berczy Village, Cornell, Markham Village, Milliken, Thornhill and Unionville. Many high-tech companies have established head offices in Markham, attracted by the relative abundance of land, low tax-rates and good transportation routes. Broadcom Canada, ATI Technologies (now known as AMD Graphics Product Group), IBM Canada, Motorola Canada, Honeywell Canada and many other well-known companies have chosen Markham as their home in Canada. The city has accordingly started branding itself as Canada's "High-Tech Capital". The province of Ontario has erected a historical plaque in front of the Markham Museum to commemorate the founding of Markham's role in Ontario's heritage.

Town council voted on May 29, 2012, to change Markham's legal designation from "town" to "city"; according to Councillor Alex Chiu, who introduced the motion, the change of designation merely reflects the fact that many people already think of Markham as a city. Some residents objected to the change because it will involve unknown costs without any demonstrated benefits. The designation officially took effect on July 1.

Geography

It is bounded by five municipalities; in the west is Vaughan with the boundary along Yonge Street between Steeles Avenue and Highway 7 and Richmond Hill with the boundary along Highway 7 from Yonge Street to Highway 404 and at Highway 404 from Highway 7 to 19th Avenue and Stouffville Road. In the south, it borders Toronto with the boundary along Steeles Avenue. In the north it borders Whitchurch–Stouffville with the boundary from Highway 404 to York-Durham Line between 19th Avenue and Stouffville Road. In the east it borders Pickering along York-Durham Line.

Topography
The city is intersected by two rivers; the Don River and Rouge River, as well as their tributaries. To the north is the Oak Ridges Moraine, which further elevates the elevation towards the north.

Climate

Markham borders and shares the same climate as Toronto. On an average day, Markham is generally  cooler than in downtown Toronto. It has a humid continental climate (Köppen climate classification Dfb) and features warm, humid summers with rainfall occurring from May to October and cold, snowy winters.

Neighbourhoods

Markham is made up of many original 19th-century communities, each with a distinctive character. Many of these, despite being technically suburban districts today, are still signed with official "city limits" signs on major roads:

 Almira
 Angus Glen
 Armadale
 Bayview Glen
 Berczy Village
 Box Grove
 Brown's Corners
 Bullock
 Buttonville
 Cachet
 Cashel
 Cathedraltown
 Cedar Grove
 Cedarwood
 Cornell
 Crosby
 Dollar
 Downtown Markham
 Dickson's Hill
 German Mills
 Greensborough
 Hagerman's Corners
 Langstaff
 Legacy
 Locust Hill
 Markham Village
 Middlefield
 Milliken Mills
 Milnesville
 Mongolia
 Mount Joy
 Quantztown
 Raymerville – Markville East
 Rouge Fairways
 Sherwood – Amber Glen
 South Unionville
 Thornhill
 Underwood, Ontario
 Unionville
 Uptown Markham
 Victoria Square
 Vinegar Hill
 Wismer Commons

Thornhill and Unionville are popularly seen as being separate communities. Thornhill straddles the Markham-Vaughan municipal boundary (portions of it in both municipalities). Unionville is a single community with three sub-communities:
 Original Unionville is along Highway 7 and Kennedy Road
 South Unionville is a newer residential community (beginning from the 1990s onwards) south of Highway 7 to Highway 407 and from McCowan to Kennedy Road
 Upper Unionville is a new residential development built on the northeast corner of 16th Avenue and Kennedy Road

Demographics

Ethnicity 
In the 2021 census, the most reported ethnocultural background was Chinese (47.9%), followed by European (17.7%), South Asian (17.6%), Black (3.1%), West Asian (2.9%), Filipino (2.7%), Korean (1.3%), Arab (1.0%), Latin American (0.8%), and Southeast Asian (0.7%).

The most common ethnic or cultural origins as per the 2021 census are as follows: Chinese (43.3%), Indian (7.0%), Canadian (4.0%), English (3.8%), Hong Konger (3.7%), Sri Lankan (3.3%), Tamil (3.1%), Irish (3.1%), Scottish (3.1%), Filipino (2.9%), Italian (2.8%), Pakistani (2.1%), and Iranian (2.0%).

Immigrants made up 58% of the population of Markham in the 2021 census. Top countries of origin for the immigrant population were China (33.8%, excluding 16.4% from Hong Kong), India (7.2%), Sri Lanka (6.4%), Philippines (3.6%), Iran (3.5%), Pakistan (2.7%), Vietnam (.1.8%), Jamaica (1.8%), Guyana (1.6).

Note: Totals greater than 100% due to multiple origin responses.

Religion 
In 2021, 40.8% of the population did not identify with a particular religion. The most reported religions were Christianity (35.1%), Hinduism (9.2%), Islam (7.9%), Buddhism (4.0%), Judaism (1.4%), and Sikhism (1.1%).

Language

Government

City Council
Markham City Council consists of Frank Scarpitti as mayor, four regional councillors and eight ward councillors each representing one of the city's eight wards. Scarpitti replaced Don Cousens, a former Progressive Conservative MPP for Markham and a Presbyterian church minister. The community elects the mayor and four regional councillors to represent the City of Markham at the regional level. The municipality pays the Councillors for their services, but in many municipalities, members of council usually serve part-time and work at other jobs. Residents elected the current members of council to a four-year term of office, in accordance with standards set by the province. The selection of members for the offices of mayor and regional councillors are made town-wide, while ward councillors are elected by individual ward.

Markham Civic Centre

The city council is at the Markham Civic Centre at the intersection of York Regional Road 7 and Warden Avenue. The site of the previous offices on Woodbine Avenue has been redeveloped for commercial uses. The historic town hall on Main Street is now a restored office building. The Mayor's Youth Task Force was created to discuss issues facing young people in the city and to plan and publicize events. Its primary purpose is to encourage youth participation within the community.

Elections
Municipal elections are held every four years in Ontario. The most recent election took place in October, 2018, and the next is scheduled for October, 2022. The links listed below provide the results of recent election results:
 2018
 2014
 2010
 2006

By-laws
The city is permitted to create and enforce by-laws upon residents on various matters affecting the town. The by-laws are generally enforced by City By-Law enforcement officers, but they may involve York Regional Police if violations are deemed too dangerous for the officers to handle. In addition the by-laws can be linked to various provincial acts and enforced by the town. Violation of by-laws is subject to fines of up to $20,000 CAD. The by-laws of Markham include:

 Animal Control (see Dog Owners' Liability Act of Ontario)
 Construction Permits
 Cannabis
 Driveway Extensions
 Fencing and Swimming Pools
 Heritage Conservation (see Ontario Heritage Act)
 Home-Based Businesses
 Noise
 Parking
 Property Standards
 Registration of Basement Apartments and Second Suites
 Sewers
 Site Alteration
 Waste Collection
 Water Use

City services

Courts and police
There are no courts in Markham, but the city is served by an Ontario Court of Justice in Newmarket, as well as an Ontario Small Claims court in Richmond Hill. There are also served by a Provincial Offence Court in Richmond Hill. The Ontario Court of Appeal is in Toronto, while the Supreme Court of Canada is in Ottawa, Ontario.

Policing is provided by York Regional Police at a station (5 District) at the corner of McCowan Road and Carlton Road and Highway 7. Highway 404, Highway 407 and parts of Highway 48 are patrolled by the Ontario Provincial Police. Toronto Police Service is responsible for patrol on Steeles from Yonge Street to the York—Durham Line.

Fire
Markham Fire and Emergency Services was established in 1970 as Markham Fire Department and replaced various local volunteer fire units. Nine fire stations serve Markham. Toronto/Buttonville Municipal Airport is also served by Markham's Fire service.

Hospitals
Markham Stouffville Hospital in the city's far eastern end is Markham's main healthcare facility, located at the intersection of Highway 7 and 9th Line (407 and Donald Cousens Parkway). Markham is also home to Shouldice Hospital, one of the world's premier facilities for people suffering from hernias. For those living near Steeles, they sometimes will be able to receive treatment at The Scarborough Hospital Birchmount Campus in Toronto/Scarborough. North York General Hospital also serves for 24/7 care, serving North York and the lower Markham area.

Garbage collection 
Garbage collection is provided by Miller Waste Systems since the company's founding in 1961. Different areas of the city are assigned different garbage collection days. Recycling is collected weekly, while household trash and yard waste is collected every other week. The last week of May is "Bulk Collection", where residents can put out as much waste as needed without limits.

To promote recycling, Markham mandated the use of clear garbage bags in 2013 to let Miller Waste staff see the contents of trash bags. Bags containing high amounts of recycling mixed with regular trash will not be collected.

Winter operations 
Winter operations are conducted on all City-owned roads according to the following criteria:
 Primary roads plowed and salted 24/7 when snow reaches 5 cm
 Secondary roads plowed between the hours of 7am and 6pm when snow reaches 5 cm
 Local roads, cul-de-sacs, and private lanes plowed when snow reaches at least 7.5 cm
 Salting is done when roads are found to be slippery

Plowing of all roads takes around 16 hours to complete after the end of a snowfall, which exceeds provincial standards.

Winter operations are conducted on all City-owned sidewalks according to the following criteria:
 Plowed and sanded when snow reaches 5 cm

Plowing of all sidewalks takes around 17 hours to complete after the end of a snowfall.

Parking is only permitted on the odd numbered side of a street from November 15 to April 15 and parking is banned when snow is falling.

Education

Post-secondary

Seneca College has a campus in Markham, at Highway 7 and the 404 near Woodbine Avenue/Leslie Street, in the York Region business district. This location opened in 2005, offering full and part-time programs in business, marketing and tourism, and also the college's departments of Finance, Human Resources and Information Technology Services. Since 2011 the campus has also housed the Confucius Institute. York University has plans to open a new campus in Downtown Markham on Enterprise Dr and Kennedy Rd (near Markham YMCA). It will serve the entirety of York Region and upper Scarborough.

Primary and secondary schools
Markham has a number of both public and Catholic high schools. All have consistently scored high on standardized tests and have some of the highest rate of graduates attending universities. 

The York Region District School Board operates secular English public schools. The York Catholic District School Board operates English Catholic schools. The Conseil scolaire Viamonde operates secular French schools, and the Conseil scolaire catholique MonAvenir operates Catholic French schools.

 York Region District School Board
 Bill Crothers Secondary School
 Bill Hogarth Secondary School
 Bur Oak Secondary School
 Markham District High School
 Markville Secondary School
 Middlefield Collegiate Institute
 Milliken Mills High School
 Pierre Elliott Trudeau High School
 Thornhill Secondary School
 Thornlea Secondary School
 Unionville High School
 York Catholic District School Board
 St. Brother André Catholic High School
 St. Augustine Catholic High School
 St. Robert Catholic High School
 Father Michael McGivney Catholic Academy

Economy

In the 19th century Markham had a vibrant, independent community with mills, distilleries and breweries around the intersection of Highway 7 and Markham Road. The Thomas Speight Wagon Works exported products (wagons, horsecars) around the world, and Markham had a reputation as being more active than York (the former name for Toronto) early on. Most of these industries disappeared leaving farming as the main source of business.

Light industries and businesses began to move into Markham in the 1980s attracted by land and lower taxes. Today, it claims to be "Canada's Hi-Tech Capital" with a number of key companies in the area, such as IBM, Motorola, Toshiba, Honeywell, Apple, Genesis Microchip, and is home to the head office of graphics card producer ATI Technologies (in 2006 merged with AMD). Over 1,100 technology and life science companies have offices in Markham, employing over one fifth of the total workforce. In 2014, the top five employers in the city in order are IBM Canada, the City of Markham, TD Waterhouse Inc., Markham Stouffville Hospital and AMD Technologies Inc.

Yogen Früz has its headquarters in Markham.

General Motors Canada Canadian Technical Centre has been located in Markham since 2017, in the building which was formerly the Canadian head office of American Express from 1985 to 2015.

Performing arts

Markham is home to several locally oriented performing arts groups:
 Kindred Spirits Orchestra
 Markham Little Theatre
 Markham Youth Theatre
 Unionville Theatre Company
 Markham Concert Band

A key arts venue is the 'Markham Theatre For Performing Arts', at the Markham Civic Centre at Highway 7 and Warden Avenue. The facility is owned by the City of Markham and operates under the city's Culture Department.

Culture

Until the 1970s, Markham was mostly farmland and marsh, as reflected in events like the Markham Fair. Markham has several theatres, Markham Little Theatre at the Markham Museum, the Markham Youth Theatre, and the Markham Theatre.

The Varley Art Gallery is the city of Markham's art museum. The gallery hosts rotating exhibits, public events, art camps and art classes, among other opportunities for citizens to get involved in the community and learn about local and Canadian art.

The Markham Public Library system has eight branches. Some branches offer unique digital tools such as a Digital Media lab with graphic designs software, a recording studio with video editing / audio editing software and a green screen, and a maker space with 3D printers, virtual reality, and laser cutters. With a library card, user can take free online courses, borrow household tools and equipment and educational toys.

Sports

Community centres and recreational facilities

Recreation Department runs programs in these facilities and maintained by the city's Operations Department:
 Aaniin Community Centre – library, indoor pool, multi-purpose rooms
 Angus Glen Community Centre – library, tennis courts, indoor pool
 Armadale Community Centre – multi-purpose rooms, outdoor tennis courts
 Centennial Community Centre – multi-purpose rooms, indoor ice rink, indoor pool, squash courts, gym
 Cornell Community Centre – library, indoor pool, multi-purpose rooms, gym, indoor track, fitness centre
 Crosby Community Centre – indoor ice rink, multi-purpose rooms
 Markham Pan Am Centre – indoor pools, gym, fitness centre
 Markham Village Community Centre – library, indoor ice rink
 Milliken Mills Community Centre – library, indoor pool, multi-purpose rooms, indoor ice rink
 Mount Joy Community Centre – outdoor soccer pitches, indoor ice rink, multi-purpose rooms
 R.J. Clatworthy Community Centre – indoor ice rink, multi-purpose rooms
 Rouge River Community Centre – multi-purpose rooms, outdoor pool
 Thornhill Community Centre – indoor ice rink, multi-purpose rooms, indoor track, library, squash court, gym

Parks and pathways

Markham has scenic pathways running over 22 km over its region. These pathways include 12 bridges allowing walkers, joggers, and cyclists to make use and enjoy the sights it has to offer. Markham's green space includes woodlots, ravines, and valleys that are not only enjoyable to its residents, but are important for the continued growth of the region's plants and animals. These natural spaces are the habitats for rare plant and insect species, offering food and homes essential for the survival of different native insects and birds.

Parks and pathways are maintained by the city's Operations Department.

Attractions

Markham has retained its historic past in part of the town. Here a just few places of interest:
 Frederick Horsman Varley Art Gallery
 Heintzman House – Home of Colonel George Crookshank, Sam Francis and Charles Heintzman of Heintzman & Co., the piano manufacturer.
 Markham Museum
 Markham Village
 Markham Heritage Estates – a unique, specially designed heritage subdivision owned by the City of Markham
 Reesor Farm Market
 Cathedral of the Transfiguration
 Thornhill village

Heritage streets preserve the old town feeling:
 Main Street Markham (Markham Road/Highway 48)
 Main Street Unionville (Kennedy Road/Highway 7)

There are still farms operating in the northern reaches of the town, but there are a few 'theme' farms in other parts of Markham:
 Galten Farms
 Forsythe Family Farms
 Adventure Valley

Markham's heritage railway stations are either an active station or converted to other uses:
 Markham GO Station – built in 1871 by Toronto and Nipissing Railway and last used by CN Rail in the 1990s and restored in 2000 as active GO station and community use
 Locust Hill Station – built in 1936 in Locust Hill, Ontario and last used by the CPR in 1969; relocated in 1983 to the grounds of the Markham Museum; replaced earlier station built in the late 19th century for the Ontario and Quebec Railway and burned down in 1935.
 Unionville Station – built in 1871 by the Toronto and Nipissing Railway, later by Via Rail and by GO Transit from 1982 to 1991; it was sold to the city in 1989 and restored as a community centre within the historic Unionville Main Street area. The building features classic Canadian Railway Style found in Markham and (old) Unionville Stations.

Annual events
Events taking place annually include the Night It Up! Night Market, Taste of Asia Festival, Tony Roman Memorial Hockey Tournament, Markham Youth Week, Unionville Festival, Markham Village Music Festival, Markham Jazz Festival, Milliken Mills Children's Festival, Markham Ribfest & Music Festival, Doors Open Markham, Thornhill Village Festival, Markham Fair, Olde Tyme Christmas Unionville, Markham Santa Claus Parade and Markham Festival of Lights.

Shopping
Markham is home to several large malls of 100+ stores. These include:

 CF Markville (160+ stores)
 First Markham Place (180 stores) and Woodside Power Centre
 King Square Shopping Mall (500+ mini-shops)
 Langham Square (700 stores)
 Pacific Mall (450 mini-shops)

There are also a lot of higher-profile malls in nearby Toronto, and elsewhere in York Region.

East Asian businesses
Many shopping centres in Markham are also ethnically Chinese and East Asian-oriented. This is a reflection of Markham's large East Asian, particularly Chinese Canadian, population making it an important Chinese community in the GTA. They carry a wide variety of traditional Chinese products, apparel, and foods.

On Highway 7, between Woodbine and Warden Avenues, is First Markham Place, containing numerous shops and restaurants; this is several kilometres east of Richmond Hill's Chinese malls. Further east along Highway 7 is an older plaza is at the southwest quadrant with the intersection with Kennedy Road.

Pacific Mall is the most well-known Chinese mall in Markham, at Kennedy Road and Steeles Avenue East, which, combined with neighbouring Market Village (now closed) and Splendid China Mall, formed the second largest Chinese shopping area in North America, after the Golden Village in Richmond, British Columbia. In close proximity, at Steeles Avenue and Warden Avenue, there is the New Century Plaza mall and a half-block away there is a plaza of Chinese shops anchored by a T & T Supermarket.

There are also some smaller shopping centres in Markham, such as:

 Albion Mall
 Alderland Centre
 Denison Centre
 J-Town
 Markham Town Square
 Metro Square
 Peachtree Centre
 New Kennedy Square
 The Shops on Steeles and 404
 Thornhill Square Shopping Centre

Local media
 Markham Review – local monthly newspaper
 TLM The Local Magazine – local satire & lifestyle magazine
 Markham Economist and Sun – community paper owned by Metroland Media Group
 The Liberal – serving Thornhill and Richmond Hill – community paper owned by Metroland Media Group
 The York Region Business Times – business news
 York Region Media Group – Online news which includes some Metroland Media papers
 North of the City – magazine for York Region
 Rogers Cable 10 – community TV station for York Region, owned by Rogers Media
 ''Markham News24' – Hyper-local, video-based news website focusing on municipal politics, crime, lifestyle and business features
 Sing Tao Daily – an ethnic Chinese newspaper that serves the Greater Toronto Area

Transportation

Roads

Road network 
Markham's road network is based on the concession system. In 1801, Markham was divided into 10 concessions, with a north–south road separating each one. The concessions were further divided by a number of east–west sideroads. This formed a grid plan road network, with an intersection occurring approximately every two kilometers. Even though some of these roads have been realigned, Markham's present road network for the most part still follows the original grid plan.

Markham's concession (north–south) arterial roads are listed below, ordered from west to east (former numbers in parenthesis):

 Yonge Street (boundary with the City of Vaughan)
 Bayview Avenue
 Leslie Street
 Woodbine Avenue
 Warden Avenue (5th Concession Road)
 Kennedy Road (6th Concession Road)
 McCowan Road (7th Concession Road)
 Markham Road (8th Concession Road) Highway 48 north of Major Mackenzie Drive
 Ninth Line (9th Concession Road)
 Reesor Road (10th Concession Road)
 Eleventh Line (11th Concession Road)
 York-Durham Line (boundary with the City of Pickering)

Reesor Road and Eleventh Line are the only north–south roads to not be regional roads. These two roads are rural routes with very few homes and minimal traffic and Eleventh Line ends just south of Highway 407 with road rerouted (old section fenced off with partial gravel bed) to intersect with York-Durham Line.

Markham's sideroad (east–west) arterials are listed below, ordered from south to north (former numbers in parenthesis):

 Steeles Avenue (original Scarborough Townline, boundary with the City of Toronto)
 14th Avenue
 Regional Road 7 (formerly Highway 7 and originally 15th Avenue)
 16th Avenue
 Major Mackenzie Drive East (17th Avenue)
 Elgin Mills Road East (18th Avenue)
 19th Avenue (boundary with the Town of Whitchurch-Stouffville)

Most of Elgin Mills Road in Markham (east of Woodbine) is not be regional road. East of Donald Cousens Boulevard serves new residential developments and east is named rural and/or agricultural.

Important thoroughfares 
Major highways that pass through Markham include King's Highway 404 (from Toronto to just south of Lake Simcoe), which marks Markham's boundary with the City of Richmond Hill, and the 407 ETR (more commonly known as Highway 407), a privately owned toll highway that passes north of Toronto and connects Markham with Burlington and Oshawa. Highway 404 is one of the most important routes used for travel to and from the City of Toronto. Highway 407 primarily serves Markham from Yonge Street to York-Durham Line. The highway connects Markham with Clarington to the east, and Burlington to the west.

One of the most heavily travelled arterial roads in Markham is Regional Road 7, a major east–west artery. This road is more commonly referred to as Highway 7, a name which comes from the time when it used to be a provincial highway. The road is still officially Highway 7 east of Reesor Road. Other major east–west routes include 16th Avenue, Major MacKenzie Drive, the combination of John Street/Esna Park Drive/14th Avenue, and Steeles Avenue which forms Markham's southern boundary with Toronto.

Rail

The GO Transit Stouffville line, a commuter rail line stretching from Lincolnville to downtown Toronto, provides passenger rail service in Markham. It operates only at rush hour and uses tracks owned by Metrolinx, the provincial transit agency. Five stations on the Stouffville line serve Markham, of which 4 are within the municipal borders. In 2015, Metrolinx announced that the Stouffville Line would get an expansion in service, bringing all day both directional trains from Union Station to Unionville GO Station. Markham's section of this GO line also came under the spotlight in 2015 as City of Toronto Mayor John Tory's announced SMART Track plan for rapid transit expansion in Toronto includes the rail spur between Union Station and the Unionville GO.

On April 8, 2019, GO Transit added ten midday train trips to Mount Joy GO Station, replacing the need for passengers to change to buses at Unionville GO.

Public transit

York Region Transit (YRT) connects Markham with surrounding municipalities in York Region, and was created in 2001 from the merger of Markham Transit, Richmond Hill Transit, Newmarket Transit and Vaughan Transit. YRT to connects to the Toronto Transit Commission (TTC) subway system by way of Viva bus rapid transit from Finch station along Yonge Street, and Don Mills station through Unionville and on to Markville Mall.

YRT has two major terminals in Markham: Unionville GO Terminal and the new Cornell Terminal, replacing Markham Stouffville Hospital Bus Terminal.

The TTC also provides service in Markham on several north–south routes, such as Warden Avenue, Birchmount Road, McCowan Road and Markham Road. These routes charge riders a double fare if they are travelling across the Steeles border.

GO Transit provides train service on the old trackbed of the Toronto and Nipissing Railway, which connects Markham with downtown Toronto on the Stouffville commuter rail service. The line has stops at several stations in Markham, namely Unionville GO Station, Centennial GO Station, Markham GO Station, and Mount Joy GO Station. The Richmond Hill commuter rail line provides service to the Langstaff GO Station, which straddles Markham and Richmond Hill but is used primarily by residents of west-central Markham and southern Richmond Hill.

Air

Toronto/Buttonville Municipal Airport, Canada's 11th busiest airport (Ontario's 4th busiest).  The airport permits general aviation and business commuter traffic to Ottawa and Montreal, Quebec. The airport is slated to close for development, but it has been delayed until at least 2023.

The airport is owned and operated by Markham Airport Inc. and owned by a numbered Ontario company owned by the Thomson family of Toronto. The airport is not part of the Greater Toronto Airports Authority (GTAA). The airport has a  runway for small and private aircraft only (with night flying capabilities). The Royal Canadian Air Cadets Gliding Program formerly used the airport for glider operations in the spring and fall.

Notable people

Partner Cities

Cultural collaboration cities
 Eabametoong First Nation, Kenora District, Ontario

Sister cities
Source:
 Cary, North Carolina, United States
 Nördlingen, Bavaria, Germany
 Wuhan, Hubei, China

Friendship cities
 Foshan, Guangdong, China
 Jiangmen, Guangdong, China
 Meizhou, Guangdong, China
 Huadu, Guangzhou, Guangdong, China
 Nanhai, Guangdong, China
 Xiamen, Fujian, China
 Zhongshan, Guangdong, China
 Ganzhou, Jiangxi, China
 Qingdao, Shandong, China
 Zibo, Shandong, China
 Mullaitivu, Northern Province, Sri Lanka

See also
 List of townships in Ontario

References

Notes

External links

 
Cities in Ontario
Lower-tier municipalities in Ontario

Populated places established in 1794
1794 establishments in the British Empire